In enzymology, a N-acetylneuraminate synthase is an enzyme that catalyzes the chemical reaction

phosphoenolpyruvate + N-acetyl-D-mannosamine + H2O  phosphate + N-acetylneuraminate

The 3 substrates of this enzyme are phosphoenolpyruvate, N-acetyl-D-mannosamine, and H2O, whereas its two products are phosphate and N-acetylneuraminate.

This enzyme belongs to the family of transferases, specifically those transferring aryl or alkyl groups other than methyl groups.  The systematic name of this enzyme class is phosphoenolpyruvate:N-acetyl-D-mannosamine C-(1-carboxyvinyl)transferase (phosphate-hydrolysing, 2-carboxy-2-oxoethyl-forming). Other names in common use include (NANA)condensing enzyme, N-acetylneuraminate pyruvate-lyase (pyruvate-phosphorylating), and NeuAc synthase.  This enzyme participates in aminosugars metabolism.

Structural studies

As of late 2007, only one structure has been solved for this class of enzymes, with the PDB accession code .

References

 
 

EC 2.5.1
Enzymes of known structure